The Academy in Peril is the second solo album by Welsh musician John Cale, released in July 1972 by record label Reprise.

Content 
Like his previous release, the Terry Riley collaboration Church of Anthrax, it is mostly instrumental. As the title suggests, the album was inspired by Cale's classical training.

"Temper", an outtake from the recording sessions, was later released on the promotional compilation Troublemakers. It was also released on the Seducing Down the Door compilation.

The cover concept and art was designed by Andy Warhol.

Release 
The Academy in Peril was released in July 1972. "Days of Steam" b/w "Legs Larry at Television Centre" was released as a single in New Zealand and was also issued as a promo in the US.

Reception

In its retrospective review, AllMusic wrote "The predominantly instrumental release [...] steers away from the more grotesque classical/rock fusions at the time to find an unexpectedly happy and often compelling balance between the two sides."

Track listing
All tracks written by John Cale.

 Side A
 "The Philosopher"
 "Brahms"
 "Legs Larry at Television Centre"
 "The Academy in Peril"

 Side B

 "Intro/Days of Steam"
 "3 Orchestral Pieces: Faust/The Balance/Captain Morgan's Lament"
 "King Harry"
 "John Milton"

Personnel

John Cale – bass, guitar, keyboards, viola
Adam Miller – vocals
Del Newman – drums
Ron Wood – slide guitar on "The Philosopher"
Legs Larry Smith – narration on "Legs Larry at Television Centre"
The Royal Philharmonic Orchestra – "3 Orchestral Pieces: Faust/The Balance/Captain Morgan's Lament" and "John Milton"
Technical 
Jean Bois – mixing engineer
Andy Warhol – artwork, cover concept
Ed Thrasher – photography

References

External links 

 

John Cale albums
1972 albums
Albums produced by John Cale
Reprise Records albums
Albums with cover art by Andy Warhol